Mishal Awad Sayaf Alhabiri (Arabic: مشعل عواد سياف الهابري) is a citizen of Saudi Arabia, who was held in extrajudicial detention in the United States Guantanamo Bay detention camps, in Cuba.
His Guantanamo Internment Serial Number was 207.
American intelligence analysts estimate he was born in 1980, in Minawara, Saudi Arabia.

Brain damage 

On March 3, 2006, the Department of Defense released 5,000 pages of documents about the detainees, in partial compliance with a court order from US District Court Judge Jed Rakoff.

Those documents revealed that Alhabiri suffered life-changing brain damage while in Guantanamo.  Camp authorities attribute the brain damage to a suicide attempt on January 16, 2003:

Fellow captives, on the other hand, attribute the brain damage to a brutal beating by the camp's controversial Immediate Reaction Force.  They say the IRF was entering all the cells on Alhabiri's cell block when detainees were loudly objecting to an account of Qur'an abuse.

Combatant Status Review

Initially the Bush administration asserted they could withhold the protections of the Geneva Conventions from captives in the War on Terror, while critics argued the Conventions obliged the United States to conduct competent tribunals to determine the status of prisoners. Subsequently the Department of Defense instituted Combatant Status Review Tribunals, to determine whether the captives met the new definition of an "enemy combatant".

Detainees do not have the right to a lawyer before the CSRTs or to access the evidence against them.  The CSRTs are not bound by the rules of evidence that would apply in court, and the government’s evidence is presumed to be “genuine and accurate.”  However, unclassified summaries of relevant evidence may be provided to the detainee and each detainee has an opportunity to present “reasonably available” evidence and witnesses.

From July 2004 through March 2005, a CSRT was convened to make a determination whether each captive had been correctly classified as an "enemy combatant".  was among the one-third of prisoners for whom there was no indication they chose to participate in their tribunals.

In the landmark case Boumediene v. Bush, the U.S. Supreme Court found that CSRTs are not an adequate substitute for the constitutional right to challenge one's detention in court, in part because they do not have the power to order detainees released.  The Court also found that "there is considerable risk of error in the tribunal’s findings of fact." 

A Summary of Evidence memo was prepared for the tribunal, listing the alleged facts that led to his detainment. His memo accused him of the following:

His Personal Representative filed the following statement on his behalf.

Administrative Review Board 

Detainees whose Combatant Status Review Tribunal classified them as "enemy combatants" were scheduled for annual Administrative Review Board hearings.  These hearings were designed to assess the threat a detainee might pose if released or transferred, and whether there were other factors that warranted his continued detention.

A Summary of Evidence memo was prepared for 
Mishal Awad Sayaf Alhabiri's
Administrative Review Board, 
on December 9, 2004.
The memo listed factors for and against his continued detention.

The following primary factors favor continued detention

The following primary factors favor release or transfer

Board recommendations 

In September 2007, the Department of Defense released an index to 133 captives' Boards memos containing the recommendations as to whether the detainees should remain in custody.
The DoD also released the memos for those 133 men.  Mishal Awad Sayaf Alhabri was not on that list.  His Board's recommendation memo was not released.

Repatriation 
Reuters cites a Human Rights Watch report that said Alhabri, and two other Saudis, were repatriated to Saudi custody on July 20, 2005.
As of May 26, 2006, the three remain held, without charge, in Riyadh's al-Ha'ir prison.

As of July 26, 2007, Mishal al Harbi, who had received treatment at a hospital in Medina, had married a Saudi women and hoped to find a job that could make him self-reliant. Before he was allowed to marry, the Saudi Interior Ministry required that he complete a number of rehabilitation programs, required for all Guantanamo returnees.

Washington Post interview 

On March 1, 2007, the Washington Post published an article about Alhabri, and his family.

The article quotes Alhabri, his older brother, and released fellow captives who had been held in cells neighboring Alhabri's, who offered an alternative account of his injury — that he was injured while the camp's Immediate Reaction Force were entering the cells of captives who were yelling in outrage after witnessing the Qur'an being abused.

According to the article Alhabri has seizures, slurred speech, tremors and twitches, and memory lapses.  He uses a wheelchair.  The article's final paragraph quotes his older brother, and caregiver:

All the men who were released from Guantanamo, they are now leading a normal life, But Mishal can't walk, get himself a glass of water or go to the bathroom by himself. I just want him to go back the way he was before Guantanamo.

See also 
 Suicide
 Cerebral hypoxia
 Guantanamo Bay detention camp suicide attempts

References

External links 
Saudi who suffered brain damage in Guantánamo gets married in Medina
Episode at Guantanamo Leaves Family at a Loss

Living people
Saudi Arabian extrajudicial prisoners of the United States
Guantanamo detainees known to have been released
Year of birth uncertain
1980 births